This is a list of African-American newspapers that have been published in North Carolina.  It includes both current and historical newspapers.  The first such newspaper in North Carolina was the Journal of Freedom of Raleigh, which published its first issue on September 30, 1865.  The African-American press in North Carolina has historically been centered on a few large cities such as Raleigh, Durham, and Greensboro.

Newspapers

See also 
List of African-American newspapers and media outlets
List of African-American newspapers in Georgia
List of African-American newspapers in South Carolina
List of African-American newspapers in Tennessee
List of African-American newspapers in Virginia
List of newspapers in North Carolina

Works cited

References 

Newspapers
North Carolina
African-American
African-American newspapers